Roman Sergeyevich Anoshkin (born 31 August 1987) is a Russian sprint canoeist. He won individual bronze medals at the 2015 World Championships and 2016 Rio Olympics. He also won a silver medal in the four-man K-4 1000 m event at the 2016 European Championships and placed ninth at the 2016 Olympics. Following this, he competed in the 2020 Olympics.

References 

1987 births
Living people
Russian male canoeists
Canoeists at the 2016 Summer Olympics
Canoeists at the 2020 Summer Olympics
Olympic canoeists of Russia
Medalists at the 2016 Summer Olympics
Olympic bronze medalists for Russia
Olympic medalists in canoeing
Canoeists at the 2019 European Games
European Games medalists in canoeing
European Games bronze medalists for Russia
Sportspeople from Moscow Oblast